The 2001–02 Deutsche Eishockey Liga season was the 8th season since the founding of the Deutsche Eishockey Liga. The league also introduced a new logo, that will stay in use until the 2011-2012 season.

The Kölner Haie won the DEL Championship the second time in their history, making it the eighth time they held the German Champion title.

Relegation was reintroduced for this season and after a playdown the Berlin Capitals were relegated to the 2nd Bundesliga. This would not be the only teams leaving the league, as the DEL withdrew the license for the Moskitos Essen and Revierlöwen Oberhausen. The Revierlöwen Oberhausen were not able to provide an DEL-sized arena and the Moskitos Essen were insolvent.

Regular season
The first 8 placed teams qualified for the playoffs. The last two were heading for a playdown series to determine the team to relegate.

GP = Games played, W = Win, SOW = Shootout Win, SOL = Shootout loss, L = Loss
 = Qualified for playoffs  = Season ended  = Relegation playdown

Playdown

The two last placed, Berlin Capitals and Schwenninger Wild Wings played a playdown best-of-seven series to determine who will be relegated.

The Berlin Capitals were to be relegated. Irrespective of their misfortunes on the ice, they would not have been able to join the DEL for the next season, as the league withdrew their license for non-compliance with the regulations.

Playoff
The playoffs were played in a best-of-five mode.

Quarterfinals
Quarterfinals started on March 22, 2002 with the bestplaced München Barons playing the 8th placed Augsburger Panther; secondplaced Adler Mannheim playing 7th placed Eisbären Berlin; thirdplaced Krefeld Pinguine playing 6th placed Kölner Haie. A curiosity were the 4th placed Nürnberg Ice Tigers playing the 5th placed Kassel Huskies, as this was the same as in the previous season.

OT = Overtime; SO = Shootout

Semifinals
The semifinals started April 1.

OT = Overtime; SO = Shootout

Finals
The finals started April 12 with Adler Mannheim playing the first game home due to better regular season placement.

OT = Overtime; SO = Shootout

The Kölner Haie were DEL Champions for the 2nd time and held the German Champion title for the 8th time in their club history.

References

1
Ger
Deutsche Eishockey Liga seasons